Pseudococcus longispinus, the long-tailed mealybug, is a species of mealybug in the family Pseudococcidae.

References

Further reading

 
 
 
 

Insects described in 1867
Pseudococcidae